Louisa Constantia Julia Eduarda Went (1 September 1865 - 29 October 1951) was a Dutch pioneer in the field of public housing and social work.

References

Dutch social workers
1865 births
1951 deaths
Place of birth missing
Place of death missing